Stenaelurillus lesserti is a species of jumping spider found in southern India and Sri Lanka. The male has red and blue horizontal stripes on the front of the face while the female is dull. There are two transverse stripes on the prosoma.

References 

Salticidae
Spiders described in 1934
Spiders of the Indian subcontinent